Complete Live at the Pershing Lounge 1958 is a live album by American jazz pianist Ahmad Jamal with performances recorded at The Pershing Lounge in Chicago, Illinois, in 1958. Some of the performances were released on the albums At the Pershing: But Not for Me and At the Pershing, Vol. 2.

Reception
The AllMusic review gave the album five stars, stating, "On January 16 and 17, 1958 pianist Ahmad Jamal, bassist Israel Crosby and drummer Vernel Fournier shared their elegant, intimate and supremely well-crafted jazz with the audience at the Pershing Lounge inside Chicago's Pershing Hotel, a venerable institution located on East 64th Street, west of South Cottage Grove Avenue. Nearly half-a-century later, Gambit Records issued all 19 tracks from the Pershing engagements on one CD, bringing before the public a body of work that two generations of jazz heads had gathered piecemeal on Argo and Chess LPs or various partial CD reissues. Tacked on to this historical edition is an edited version of 'Poinciana' released as a single after it became apparent that it had hit potential. A humorous moment occurred when the trio launched into a rapid rendition of 'Music Music Music', a pop hit borrowed from perky Teresa Brewer. Ahmad Jamal transformed each familiar melody into a sculpted ritual of improvisation, conducted with brilliant precision and immaculate ease. Even as this can and does occur in the controlled recording studio environment, when the artist performs in public, the magic might well magnify itself. Anyone who loves jazz or wants to understand it more clearly should really make an effort to hear this music played live, and pursue the best recorded examples of jazz performed in front of living, breathing audiences. Examples that spring to mind are Willie 'The Lion' Smith Live at Blues Alley, Louis Armstrong at Town Hall, Billie Holiday at Storyville, Duke Ellington at Newport, Yusef Lateef Live at Pep's, Sonny Rollins at Montreux, Charles Mingus' Mingus at Antibes, John Coltrane at the Vanguard, Miles Davis at the Fillmore, Lee Morgan Live at the Lighthouse and Rahsaan Roland Kirk at Keystone Korner. One essential addition needs to be made to that list: the music presented live in 1958 by the Ahmad Jamal Trio at the Pershing Lounge and the Spotlite Club. All of Jamal's recordings from these two engagements that are known to exist are now available from the Gambit reissue label."

Personnel
 Ahmad Jamal – piano
 Israel Crosby – double bass
 Vernel Fournier – drums

References 

Argo Records live albums
Ahmad Jamal live albums
1958 live albums